is a Japanese professional baseball catcher who is currently a free agent. He has played in Nippon Professional Baseball (NPB) for the Yokohama BayStars/Yokohama DeNA BayStars and Hokkaido Nippon-Ham Fighters.

Career

On May 25, 2008, Kurobane made his NPB debut.

On December 2, 2020, he become a free agent.

References

External links

 NPB.com

1987 births
Living people
Baseball people from Yokohama
Hokkaido Nippon-Ham Fighters players
Japanese baseball players
Nippon Professional Baseball catchers
Yokohama BayStars players
Yokohama DeNA BayStars players